Åsebro IF is a Swedish football club located in Mellerud.

Background
Åsebro IF currently plays in Division 5 Bohuslän/Dalsland which is the seventh tier of Swedish football. They play their home matches at the Rudevi IP in Mellerud. Åsebro was founded 1963 as a conclusion of the three teams Bolstad GoIF, Grinstad IF and Erikstad GoSK.

The club is affiliated to Dalslands Fotbollförbund.  Åsebro IF have competed in the Svenska Cupen on 18 occasions and have played 32 matches in the competition. They played in the 2010 Svenska Cupen but lost 0–2 at home to Utsiktens BK in the preliminary round.

Season to season

Footnotes

External links
 Åsebro IF – Official website
 Åsebro IF on Facebook
 Åsebro IF withdrawn from Div.4 2014

Football clubs in Västra Götaland County